Balavant Apte, also called Bal Apte and Balasaheb Apte (18 January 1939 – 17 July 2012) was a lawyer, politician of the Bharatiya Janata Party (BJP) and a member of the Parliament of India representing Maharashtra in the Rajya Sabha, the upper house of the Indian Parliament. He was a MA LLM. He died on 17 July 2012 at Hinduja Hospital in Mumbai.

Career 
Bal Apte was a Vice President of the BJP. He had been actively involved in the legal process of the Ram Janmabhoomi movement. He rose to fame after the BJP's defeat in the 2009 General elections, when he was appointed to frame a report on the reasons for the Party's loss. Called the "Bal Apte Report," it was a big critique of the functioning of the party and an indirect indictment of many of its top leaders.

Apte was a dedicated swayamsevak of the Rashtriya Swayamsevak Sangh and the National President of the Akhil Bharatiya Vidyarthi Parishad and was active in ABVP for 38 Years. He was an Additional Advocate General for the State of Maharashtra and a Senior Advocate of the Supreme Court of India.

References

External links
 india.go.in
 Profile on Rajya Sabha website

1939 births
2012 deaths
Bharatiya Janata Party politicians from Maharashtra
Rajya Sabha members from Maharashtra
Maharashtra politicians
Deaths from lung disease
Rashtriya Swayamsevak Sangh members
Rajya Sabha members from the Bharatiya Janata Party